Cataldo Salerno (born 1951) is an Italian politician, and the President of the Province of Enna, in the centre of Sicily.

He was born in Enna. A graduate in philosophy and (honoris causa) in psychology, Salerno founded the Kore University of Enna, and is the president of the university and the president of the university's foundation.

Salerno was elected President of the Province of Enna in 2003 with the 60% of the votes; he was a candidate of the main Italian centre-left party, Democrats of the Left.

References

1951 births
Living people
People from Enna
Democrats of the Left politicians
Democratic Party (Italy) politicians
21st-century Italian politicians
Presidents of the Province of Enna